Li Changyu may refer to:

 Henry Lee (forensic scientist) (born 1938), Taiwanese American forensic scientist
 Li Changyu (speed skater) (born 1983), Chinese speed skater